Chulabhorn Research Institute is a biomedical and chemistry research institute in Bangkok, Thailand. Initiated by Princess Chulabhorn in 1987, it was established as an independent agency funded by the Thai government.

The institute operates nine laboratories in biochemistry, biotechnology, medicinal chemistry, chemical carcinogenesis, environmental toxicology, immunology, natural products, organic synthesis and pharmacology. Besides research, the institute offers training as well as master's and doctoral degree programs in Environmental Toxicology, Technology and Management.

The affiliated Chulabhorn Cancer Center was renamed to Chulabhorn Hospital in 2009. Chulabhorn Graduate Institute opened in June 2007.

References

External links 

 

Research institutes in Thailand
Biochemistry research institutes
Organizations established in 1997
1997 establishments in Thailand
Chulabhorn Royal Academy